The following is a partial list of products manufactured under the Hewlett-Packard brand.

Printers

HP categories of printers as of November 2014 are:

Black and white laser printers
Color laser printers
Laser multifunction printers
Inkjet all-in-one printers
Specialty Photo inkjet printers
Business ink printers
Color inkjet printers
HP Designjet large format printers
HP Indigo Digital Presses
HP Inkjet Digital Web Press
HP latex printers
HP Scitex large format printers
Network print servers

Black and white laser printers

(Current Line: November 2014)

High-volume black and white laser printers
LaserJet 700 printer
LaserJet M806 printer

Office black and white laser printers
LaserJet 400 printer
LaserJet 600 printer
LaserJet P2000 printer
LaserJet P3000 prin

Color laser printers

(As of November 2014)

Laser multifunction printers

(As of November 2014)

Discontinued models

Inkjet all-in-one printers

(As of November 2014)

Specialty photo inkjet printers

(As of November 2014)

Compact photo printers
Photosmart A310 Printer
Photosmart A430 Portable Photo Studio Series

Business ink printers

(Current Line: November 2014)

Business ink multifunction printers
Officejet Enterprise Color X585 Multifunction Printer
Officejet Pro X476/X576 Multifunction Printer

Page wide array printers
Officejet Enterprise Color X555 Printer
Officejet Pro X451 Printer
Officejet Pro X551 Printer

6+3262

36+41

Color inkjet printers

(Current Line: November 2014)

Discontinued models

Designjet printers 
(Current Line: November 2014)

Discontinued models

HP Indigo Digital Presses 
(Current Line: November 2014)

HP Inkjet Digital Web Press 
(Current Line: November 2014)

Inkjet Digital Web Press
T300 Inkjet Web Press series

HP latex printers 
Current Line: (June 2015)

HP Scitex large format printers 
Current Line: (June 2015)

Network print servers 
Current Line: (November 2014)

Printer Notes: 
In HP printers introduced since ca 2006, alpha codes indicate product groupings and optional features, thus for example:

HP software products
 HP Cloud Services Print App series
 HP Connected Music
 HP Connected Photo
 HP Instant Ink series
 HP Link Reader
 HP Live Photo
 HP Photo Creations Software
 HP Scan and Capture Application
 HP Smart Web Printing Software
 HP SureSupply Software
 HP Touch point Manager
 HP Update Software
 HP WallArt Solution

HP converged cloud products

 HP Public Cloud
 HP CloudSystem

Digital cameras

Original line

HP E-series

HP M-series

HP R-series

Scanners

Scanjet series

Film scanners

Tablet computers 

 HP 7 1800
 HP Slate
 Slate 6
 Slate 7
 Slate 8 Plus
 Slate 10 Plus
 HP TouchPad
 HP Omni 10
 HP Stream 7
 HP Stream 8
 HP Envy 8 Note
 HP 408
 HP 608
 HP 612
 HP ElitePad

Mobile phones 

 Palm Prē, Prē Plus, Prē 2, Prē 3
 HP Veer
 Palm Pixi, Pixi Plus
HP Elite x3

Pocket computer
 HP-75 BASIC hand-held 1982

LX series

OmniGo series

Jornada

iPAQ

Originally made by Compaq, acquired by HP in 2002 following the merger.

Source:  HP Handheld/Pocket/Palmtop PCs

Desktop calculators and computers
HP 9800 series desktop computers as follows:

Computer terminals

Plotters

Pocket calculators

Calculator wristwatches:
 HP-01

Business desktops

Compaq Evo

The Compaq Evo line of business desktops and laptops were originally made by Compaq and was rebranded HP Compaq after the 2002 merger (see HP Business Desktops for recent products).

HP X-Terminal
See HP X-Terminals

HP TouchSmart PC

HP Brio

HP Vectra

HP e-PC (e-Vectra)

HP Compaq desktops
See HP Business Desktops

HP Pro/ProDesk

HP Elite/EliteDesk

Thin clients

Blade System

Thin client
See also HP Mobile Thin Clients

Personal desktops

Compaq Presario desktops 

A series of desktop computers made by Compaq under the Compaq Presario brand since 1993. Discontinued in 2013.

HP Pavilion

HP Slimline PC

HP Pavilion Media Center TV

HP Pavilion Elite 
HP Pavilion Elite m9000 series - m9040n

HP Blackbird 002
HP Blackbird 002

HP Black wired keyboards
 HP 434820-167 PS2 Keyboard

Business notebooks

Compaq Evo

The Compaq Evo line of business desktops and laptops were originally made by Compaq and was rebranded HP Compaq after the 2002 merger (see below for recent products).

HP Compaq laptops

HP Mini

HP ProBook

HP EliteBook
See the HP EliteBook article for more details.

First generation — The xx30 generation comprised the following models:

Second generation — The xx40 series comprised the following models:

Third generation — The xx60 series, announced on February 23, 2011, comprised the following models:

Fourth generation — The fourth generation, announced on May 9, 2012, comprised the following models:

Mobile thin client

Rugged notebooks

Personal notebooks

HP OmniBook 

HP's line of notebook computers since 1993. In chronological order of release:

Following HP's acquisition of Compaq in 2002, this series of notebooks was discontinued, replaced with the HP Pavilion, HP Compaq, and Compaq Presario notebooks.

Compaq Presario laptops 

An exclusive series of notebook computers made by Compaq under the Compaq Presario brand since 1993. Replaces HP OmniBook in 2002; Discontinued in 2013.

HP Pavilion notebooks 

A series of multimedia notebooks. Some models had the HP developed QuickPlay software which enabled booting to a linux based DVD/Music player held on a separate partition.

HP Envy

HP G series

HP Mini

Workstations

PA-RISC based

Itanium based

Alpha based (from DEC, via Compaq)

x86 based

Blade Workstations

Servers

x86 (Intel & AMD Opteron) based

Entry-level servers 
Despite the ProLiant name on some of HP's entry level servers, they are based on former HP tc series (NetServer) servers, and as such do not come with Compaq's SmartStart or Insight Management Agents.

ProLiant ML 
These are in a tower form factor.

G1 (retired) 

 Compaq ML330
 Compaq ML330e
 Compaq ML350
 Compaq ML370
 Compaq ML530
 Compaq ML570
 Compaq ML750

G2 (retired) 
Marketed as Compaq

 Compaq ML330
 Compaq ML350
 Compaq ML370

Marketed as HP

 HP ML110
 HP ML150
 HP ML370
 HP ML530
 HP ML570

G3 (retired) 
 HP ML110
 HP ML150
 HP ML310
 HP ML330
 HP ML350
 HP ML370
 HP ML570

G4 (retired) 
ML 100 series

 HP ML110
 HP ML110 storage server
 HP ML115
 HP ML150

ML 300 series

 HP ML310
 HP ML330
 HP ML350
 HP ML350 storage server
 HP ML370

G5 (retired) 
ML 100 series

 HP ML110
 HP ML110 storage server
 HP ML115
 HP ML150

ML 300 series

 HP ML310
 HP ML350
 HP ML350 storage server
 HP ML370

G6 (retired) 
ML100 series
HP ML110
HP ML150
ML300 series
HP ML330
HP ML350
HP ML370

G7 (retired) 
ML100 series

 HP ML110

Gen8 (retired) 
ML300 series

 HP ML310e
 HP ML350e
 HP ML350p

Gen9 (retired) 
Marketed as HP

 HP ML10
 HP ML10 V2
 HP ML30
 HP ML110
 HP ML150
 HP ML350

Marketed as HPE

 HPE ML10
 HPE ML30
 HPE ML110
 HPE ML350

Gen10 

 HPE ML30
 HPE ML110
 HPE ML350

ProLiant DL
These are in a rack mount form factor.

NetServer
HP NetServer LPr
HP NetServer LP1000R (retired)
HP NetServer LP2000R (retired)
HP NetServer LH3 (retired)
HP NetServer LH3R (retired)
HP NetServer LH4 (retired)
HP NetServer LH4R (retired)
HP NetServer LH3000 (retired)
HP NetServer LH6000 (retired)
HP NetServer LHX8000 (retired)
HP NetServer LHX8500 (retired)
The ProLiant servers below are based on Compaq's ProLiants and do come with SmartStart and Compaq's Insight Management Agents:

ProLiant

ProLiant ML Series
These are in a tower form factor.
Compaq ProLiant ML310

Compaq ProLiant ML330

Compaq ProLiant ML350
Note that 'e' indicates 'essential' and 'p' indicates 'performance' variants.

Compaq ProLiant ML370

Compaq ProLiant ML570
ProLiant ML570 G2 (retired)

ProLiant DL Series
These are in a rack mount form factor.
Compaq ProLiant DL320 (1U, single processor server)

Compaq ProLiant DL360 (1U, 2-processor server, 2hot swap Compaq universal hard disks)

ProLiant DL365 (retired)

Compaq ProLiant DL380

ProLiant DL385

ProLiant DL560 G1 (retired)

ProLiant DL580

ProLiant DL585 (supports up to four dual or core AMD Opteron)

ProLiant DL740 (retired)

Compaq ProLiant DL760 (retired)
ProLiant DL760 G2 (retired)

ProLiant DL785 (supports up to eight quad-core AMD Opteron)
ProLiant DL785 G6

ProLiant DL980 G7 (supports up to 8 Intel Xeon E7-4800 and 7500 series processors)

ProLiant BLp blades
These are in a blade form factor.
ProLiant BL20p

ProLiant BL25p

ProLiant BL30p

ProLiant BL35p

ProLiant BL40p

ProLiant BL45p

ProLiant BLc blades

ProLiant BL2x220c

ProLiant BL260c   (G5 only)

ProLiant BL280c   (G6 only)

ProLiant BL460c

ProLiant BL465c

ProLiant BL480c

ProLiant BL490c

Proliant BL495c

Proliant BL660c   (G8)

ProLiant BL680c

ProLiant BL685c

Itanium based

HPE Integrity Servers

 rx1600 series – 1U
 rx1600
 rx1620
 rx2600 series – 2U
 rx2600
 rx2620
 rx2660
 rx3600        – 4U
 rx4610        – 7U
 rx4640        – 4U
 rx5670        – 7U
 rx6600        – 7U
 rx7600 series – 10U
 rx7610
 rx7620
 rx7640
 rx8600 series – 17U
 rx8620
 rx8640
 HP Superdome
 SX1000 based – SX2000 based

Integrity BL blades

Compaq ProLiant
Compaq ProLiant DL590/64 (retired)

Alpha based

PA-RISC based

Scalable servers and supercomputer nodes

Apollo series

SGI series 
 HPE SGI 8600

Enterprise storage 

 HP StorageWorks XP storage array
 StorageWorks EVA storage array (from Compaq)
 HP AutoRAID storage array (retired)
 HP VA storage array (retired)
 HP Jamaica storage enclosure (retired)

"StorageWorks" Storage element managers 

Command View XP
Command View AE
Command View EVA
Command View SDM.
StorageWorks Command View TL

Storage area management 
 HP Storage Essentials
 OpenView Storage Area Manager

ProCurve
ProCurve Networking by HP is the networking division of HP.

Telepresence and videoconferencing

 HP Halo, a high-end immersive telepresence system, was sold to Polycom on June 1, 2011.

External hard disk drives
 HP External Hard Drive (1 TB, USB 3.0)
 HP Portable Hard Drive (1 TB, USB 3.0)
 HP USB flash Drive 16 gb
 HP DVD- R

See also
List of Palm OS devices
List of Dell PowerEdge Servers

References

 
Hewlett-Packard products
Hewlett-Packard products
Videotelephony
Hewlett-Packard